Radio Lublin (Polskie Radio Lublin S.A.) - Polish public, regional broadcaster based in Lublin in east Poland. Radio Lublin is a part of a national public radio (Polish Radio). It is formatted as talk and music (contemporary hits) radio.

History
Radio Lublin has started on 20 September 1952 as a cable station. Since 1 May 1957 it broadcast on the AM and since 28 December 1963 on the FM band. Today Radio Lublin broadcasts on the internet too.

Broadcast frequencies
 Biała Podlaska - 93,1 FM
 Lublin - 89,9 FM
 Piaski - 102,2 FM
 Ryki - 103,1 FM
 Zamość - 103,2 FM

External links
 Official web 
 History of Radio Lublin 

Radio stations established in 1952
Mass media in Lublin
Polskie Radio